Schoology is a learning management system for schools and businesses that enables its users to create, manage, and share assignments and resources. Also known as a web content management system or virtual learning environment, the cloud-based platform provides tools to manage classrooms or blended learning.

Background 
Schoology was designed by Jonathan Friedman, Ryan Hwang, and Tim Trinidad in 2007 while studying at Washington University in St. Louis. Originally designed for sharing notes, features were gradually added and modified.

Schoology secured its first round of equity financing, totaling $1,250,000, with an investment of unknown origin in 2009 and an investment by Meakam Becker Venture Capital in June 2010. In 2012, Schoology raised $6 million in a round led by Firstmark Capital; in 2014, it raised $15 million in a funding round led by Intel Capital; in November 2015, it raised $32 million in a funding round, led by JMI Equity.

In November 2013, Schoology had over 7.5 million users across about 60,000 schools.

Product 
Visually, Schoology is very similar to the environment of many social networks. The service includes attendance records, grades, exams, and homework. The interface aims to facilitate collaboration within a class, group, or school through shared libraries of resources. Schoology can be integrated with the school's current grading system.

Schoology is offered to educators for free. Revenue is generated with a fee for add-ons such as custom branding, advanced analytics, Single Sign-On, and data integration with student information systems. The service can also be integrated services such as Google Drive, Dropbox, and Evernote. Native mobile applications are available for iOS, Android, and Kindle devices.

Schoology offers accounts for parents to view students' grades, attendance, assignments, and even allowing them to upload media and documents to the platform. Schoology for parents is accessible through the application portal.

References 

Social networking services
Learning management systems
Educational software